Liberty Township is a township in Stoddard County, in the U.S. state of Missouri.

Liberty Township was erected in 1835.

References

Townships in Missouri
Townships in Stoddard County, Missouri
1835 establishments in Missouri
Populated places established in 1835